Akim Oda is a town in the Eastern Region of south Ghana and is the capital of the Birim Central Municipal District and the traditional capital of  Akyem Kotoku. In 2013, Akim Oda had a settlement population of 60,604 people.

Geography and climate
Akim Oda lies in hilly country of south Ghana with rain forest vegetation in the Birim River basin.

The climate of Akim Oda is semi-equatorial and wet with significant precipitation during the rainy season from April to June and again from September to November. A dry period is experienced between December to February.

During this period temperatures are also significantly colder. Many outdoor and street carnivals are held in the town during this season.

Economy

Agriculture
Cocoa is an important part of the Akim Oda economy, including plantations and casual plantings along roadsides. The crop is dried and stored in warehouses for shipment. There are several small palm oil farms to the north of the Birim river, covering about 6,000 hectares. Byproducts from the palm-oil mills are used in soap-making. Bamboo is another crop grown in Akim Oda, used for furniture and construction.

Mining
The Akim Oda bank of the Birim river is rich in gold and diamonds, extracted locally through artisanal mining processes.

Forestry
The Akim Oda forests contain valuable trees, and there is some lumbering. The total forest area of Ghana dropped from 8.2 million hectares around 1900 to 1.6 million hectares by the year 2000 and continues to decline rapidly due to demand both for exports and construction from the growing Ghanaian economy. Forest plantations being introduced near Akim Oda (and throughout the entire country under the National Forest Plantation Development Programme) may help to reverse the decline.

Tourism
Attractions include dug-out boat tours to view the Akim Oda mining operations, traditional ceremonies usually including drumming performances with the Akan drum, the biggest tree in West Africa at 12 meters circumference (diameter = 3.8m) and 66.5 meters tall and a bustling outdoor market. Ghanaian food is also an important attraction.

Healthcare
The Akim Oda Government Hospital is the only public health care provider in the town of Akim Oda, serving the Kotoku traditional area and as a referral point for the adjourning communities in the Akyem states near Akim Oda.

Other major private clinics such as the Jubilee hospital and Oda Community Hospital also provide health care to the inhabitants of the Akyem Kotoku, Bosome and part of the Abuakwa traditional area.

Education
The Kotoku traditional area contains several public and private educational institutions. There are over fifteen public primary and junior high school, three major public senior high schools, and 20 competitive private schools.

Notable people 
Notable people born in Akim Oda include:

 Kuami Eugene, a Ghanaian musician
 Benjamin Azamati-Kwaku, a Ghanaian sprinter
 Ursula Owusu, a Ghanaian lawyer and politician
 Benny Morgan, a Ghanaian musician
 Emmanuel Oti Essigba, a Ghanaian footballer
 Justice Joe Appiah, a politician

Media coverage
Akim Oda currently has four major radio stations which serve the Akyem states and the country as a whole that help shape social, economic and political issues.

References

Populated places in the Eastern Region (Ghana)